Peter J Gillam (born 1956), is a male retired archer who competed for Great Britain and England.

Archery career
Gillam represented Great Britain in the 1984 Summer Olympics. He represented England in the men's individual event, at the 1982 Commonwealth Games in Brisbane, Queensland, Australia.

References

1956 births
English male archers
Archers at the 1982 Commonwealth Games
Archers at the 1984 Summer Olympics
Olympic archers of Great Britain
People from Folkestone
Living people
Commonwealth Games competitors for England